The 1998 Webby Awards were held on March 6, 1998, at the San Francisco Palace of Fine Arts, and were the first event ever to be broadcast live via the Web in 3D.  The "People's Voice" awards, chosen by online poll, received 100,000 cumulative votes that year.

The Web magazine, which was hosting the awards, was closed down by its parent company IDG shortly before the awards, and the ceremony continued thereafter under the management of Tiffany Shlain, who IDG had hired in 1996 to coordinate the awards.  The International Academy of Digital Arts and Sciences was constituted that year as the judging panel for the awards, continues to do so as of the 2007 awards.

Nominees and winners

Winners and nominees:

References
Winners and nominees are generally named according to the organization or website winning the award, although the recipient is, technically, the web design firm or internal department that created the winning site and in the case of corporate websites, the designer's client.  Web links are provided for informational purposes, both in the most recently available archive.org version before the awards ceremony and, where available, the current website.  Many older websites no longer exist, are redirected, or have been substantially redesigned.

External links
 

1998
1998 awards in the United States
1998 in San Francisco
March 1998 events in the United States